Meet the Parents is a 2000 comedy film directed by Jay Roach, a remake of the 1992 film.

Meet the Parents may also refer to:

 Meet the Parents (1992 film), an independent low-budget comedy by Greg Glienna
 Meet the Parents (film series), a comedy film series that began with the 2000 film
 Meet the Parents (soundtrack), original motion picture soundtrack for the 2000 film
 "Meet the Parents" (Good Luck Charlie), an episode of the TV series Good Luck Charlie
 Meet the Parents (TV series), a 2010 British reality series shown on E4
 "Meet the Parents", a song by Kim Petras from Clarity